"Asignatura Pendiente" (English: Unresolved Matter) is the third single from Ricky Martin's album, Almas del Silencio (2003). It was released by Sony Discos and Columbia Records on August 11, 2003, in Latin territories. The song was written by Guatemalan singer-songwriter Ricardo Arjona and produced by Tommy Torres. The original version by Arjona was recorded before and remained unpublished until its release in his 2004 Solo album.

A music video was also released.

Chart performance
"Asignatura Pendiente" reached number five on the Billboard Hot Latin Tracks in the United States.

Formats and track listings
US promotional CD single
"Asignatura Pendiente" – 3:57

Charts

References

2003 singles
2003 songs
Ricky Martin songs
Spanish-language songs
2000s ballads
Latin ballads
Pop ballads
Songs written by Ricardo Arjona
Sony Discos singles
Columbia Records singles
Ricardo Arjona songs

th:มายเลิฟ (เพลงเซลีน ดิออน)